2016 China Open may refer to:

 2016 China Open (tennis)
 2016 China Open (snooker)